Jules Eugène Émile Coutray de Pradel (24 October 1861 – 20 August 1926) was a French fencer. He competed in the men's épée event at the 1900 Summer Olympics.

References

External links
 

1861 births
1926 deaths
French male épée fencers
Olympic fencers of France
Fencers at the 1900 Summer Olympics
Fencers from Paris